Daniel Martin Klein (born 1939 in Wilmington, Delaware) is an American writer of fiction, non-fiction, and humor. His most notable works are Plato and a Platypus Walk Into a Bar co-written with Thomas Cathcart. and Travels With Epicurus.

Life
Klein went to school at Harvard College where he received a B.A. in philosophy. After a brief career in television comedy, he began writing books, ranging from thrillers and mysteries to humorous books about philosophy, including the New York Times bestseller, Plato and a Platypus Walk Into a Bar: Understanding Philosophy Through Jokes (with Thomas Cathcart) and the London Times bestseller Travels With Epicurus. He lives in Great Barrington, Massachusetts, and was married to Freke Quirine Vuijst (1952-2020) until her death from cancer . She was the American correspondent for the Dutch newsweekly, Vrij Nederland. Their daughter, Samara Quirine Klein, is Head librarian for the towns of Great Barrington and Housatonic MA.

Awards
‘ForeWord Magazine' Book of the Year – Silver Award in Literary Fiction (2009) for novel, 'The History of Now'.

List of books

Non-Fiction
 Travels with Epicurus: A Journey to a Greek Island in Search of a Fulfilled Life, Penguin, 2012, 
 Heidegger and a Hippo Walk Through Those Pearly Gates: Using Philosophy (and Jokes!) to Explore Life, Death, the Afterlife, and Everything in Between, (with Thomas Cathcart), Viking, 2009. 
 Aristotle and an Aardvark Go to Washington: Understanding Political Doublespeak through Philosophy and Jokes, (with Thomas Cathcart), Abrams Books, 2008. 
 Plato and a Platypus Walk Into a Bar: Understanding Philosophy Through Jokes, (with Thomas Cathcart), Abrams Books, 2007. 
 The Half-Jewish Book: A Celebration (with Freke Vuijst), Villard, 2000. 
 Every Time I Find the Meaning of Life, They Change It: Wisdom of the Great Philosophers on How to Live, Penguin, 2015 
 I Think, Therefore I Draw: Understanding Philosophy Through Cartoons (with Thomas Cathcart), Penguin, 2018

Thrillers and Mysteries

 Embryo, Doubleday, 1980. 
 Wavelengths, Doubleday, 1982. 
 Beauty Sleep, St. Martin's, 1990. 
 Kill Me Tender, St. Martin's Minotaur, 2002. 
 Blue Suede Clues, St. Martin's Minotaur, 2003. 
 Viva Las Vengeance, St. Martin's Minotaur, 2003. 
 Such Vicious Minds, St. Martin's Minotaur, 2004

Novels

 Nothing Serious, Permanent Press, 2013. 
 The History of Now, Permanent Press, 2009. 
 Magic Time, Doubleday, 1984.

Plays

 The Jewish Jester, New Stage Performing Arts, Berkshire Theater Festival, Stockbridge, MA, 2013
 Mengelberg and Mahler, Shakespeare & Company, Lenox, MA, 2010

Book Reviews

Nothing Serious 

Kirkus described the book as follows: "A hip editor takes the helm of Cogito, a stodgy philosophical journal, with mixed—and occasionally hilarious—results."
New York Journal of Books reviewer Karl Wolff wrote, “. . . a rollicking farce . . . a tightly plotted comedic tale with a genuine emotional center and a sharp satirical wit.”

References

12. http://thoughtcatalog.com/the-thoughtful-reader/2010/08/theater-review-mengelberg-and-mahler/

External links
 Plato and a Platypus Walk Into a Bar Official website

1939 births
American mystery writers
Harvard College alumni
Living people
American male novelists